Orlando Gray Wales (also O.G. Wales) (1865–1933) was an American landscape painter and Pennsylvania impressionist who lived and painted in Allentown and the Lehigh Valley region of Pennsylvania. Wales was considered to be one of the best still-life artists of the day.

Wales was born in Philadelphia, Pennsylvania and studied at the Pennsylvania Academy of Fine Arts with William Merritt Chase and Alphonse Mucha.

He first exhibited in 1912 at the studio of fellow painter and photographer Arlington Nelson Lindenmuth. A Wales painting was one of the first 110 works acquired and exhibited by the Allentown Art Museum upon its opening in 1936.

He maintained a studio at Tenth and Hamilton Streets in Allentown.

As a teacher, his students included John E. Berninger and Clarence Dreisbach. Wales maintained a lifelong friendship with illustrator, painter, and printmaker Ella Sophonisba Hergesheimer, who was also raised in Allentown and also studied at the Pennsylvania Academy of Fine Arts.

References

1865 births
1933 deaths
19th-century American male artists
19th-century American painters
20th-century American painters
20th-century American male artists
American Impressionist painters
American male painters
Artists from Allentown, Pennsylvania
Artists from Philadelphia
Painters from Pennsylvania
Pennsylvania Academy of the Fine Arts alumni